The E-3000E3B is a diesel locomotive designed and built by National Railway Equipment Company for export to Australia.

Operators

Qube
Qube ordered 12 units in 2011. The first were delivered in December 2011 and the next seven in 2012.

Consolidated Rail Leasing
Consolidated Rail Leasing ordered an unspecified number of units. As at 2022, they had yet to be built.

White Pass & Yukon
The White Pass & Yukon Route placed an order for six units, classed as E3000CC-DC in 2020.

Summary

References

Co-Co locomotives
Diesel-electric locomotives of Australia
NRE locomotives
Railway locomotives introduced in 2011